Halton is a small village and civil parish in the Buckinghamshire district of the ceremonial county of Buckinghamshire, England, located about two miles north of Wendover and five miles southeast of Aylesbury.

Geography
Halton lies just outside the Metropolitan Green Belt so it has not been protected from postwar housing development. At its southern end it is contiguous with Wendover, but it retains a separate, older village centre anchored by St Michael & All Angels Church and a community hall. There is a separate, modern Catholic Church. The Parish also includes RAF Halton, a Royal Air Force (RAF) training station with a grass airfield used for glider training. 
Most modern housing in the village was built for RAF personnel, but some is now in private hands. A small shop mainly serves the RAF community. The base had a large military hospital employing hundreds of people, which was closed in 1995. The buildings remained until 2007/8 when they were demolished for the Princess Mary Gate housing scheme on land between Halton and Wendover.

In the Chiltern Hills above Halton is Halton House, a country house in the style of a French chateau, which is currently used as the main Officers' Mess for RAF Halton. It was originally built for Alfred de Rothschild in 1880. The RAF demolished its domed winter garden to build an accommodation block.

Facilities
Halton Community Combined School is a mixed primary school, which takes children from the age of four through to the age of eleven. The school has 91 pupils and was recently (Mar 2011) judged 'excellent' by OFSTED, despite having 70% of its pupils from Forces backgrounds who move frequently. 
The Halton Tennis Centre has a small number of future athletes combining competitive tennis training with home schooling. The Centre was formerly run by the RAF, who still train there. The school also contains Halton Preschool, which is a mixed preschool, which takes children from 2 to 4 in classes of 15 to 30.

Transport
The nearest railway station is Wendover, on the Chiltern Railways line between Aylesbury and London Marylebone (via Amersham). Journey times to London are under an hour. A single track railway line used to run from Halton, crossing the A413 by way of a level crossing, to a bay platform at the north end of Wendover station.

Route 8 is served by Arriva and is a bus from and to the Main Point at RAF Halton.

The Wendover arm of the Grand Union Canal flows through Halton on its course from Wendover to join the Grand Union beside Marsworth lock near Tring.

Popular culture
Halton gave its name to the Handley Page Halton, a cargo version of the Halifax bomber.

References

External links

Villages in Buckinghamshire
Civil parishes in Buckinghamshire
Aylesbury Vale